New is an English surname, occurring in Britain and countries to which British people have emigrated, including Australia, Canada, New Zealand et cetera.

In England, the family name New is particularly known from Warwickshire, Gloucestershire, Worcestershire, Wiltshire and Dorset.

Some immigrants of Central European origins with names like Neu or Neumann have anglicised their family name to New.

People with the surname New include

Edmund Hort New,  English illustrator
George New, (1894–1963), American artist
Hannah New, British actress
Jane New,  wife of band leader Tommy Dorsey
Jethro New (1757–1825), frontiersman and Continental Army soldier
Robert A. New (1789–1856), 1st Secretary of State of Indiana
Jeptha Dudley New (1830–1892), U.S. Representative from Indiana
John C. New (1831–1906), Treasurer of the United States, 1875–76
John D. New (1924–1944), U.S. Medal of Honor recipient
Peter New Canadian actor, voice actor and screenwriter
Tom New,  English cricketer
W. H. New,  b. 1938, Canadian poet and literary critic
Chris New, b. 1981, British actor

English-language surnames